"Wind Beneath My Wings" (sometimes titled "The Wind Beneath My Wings" and "Hero") is a song written in 1982 by Jeff Silbar and Larry Henley.

The song was first recorded by Kamahl in 1982 for a country and western album he was recording. Kamahl talked about being the first to record the song in an appearance on Australian TV show Spicks and Specks, but stated it was not commercially released because it was felt he did not suit the country and western style. Instead, Roger Whittaker recorded the song, as well as Sheena Easton and Lee Greenwood. The song appeared shortly thereafter in charted versions by Colleen Hewett (1982), Lou Rawls (1983), Gladys Knight & the Pips (1983), and Gary Morris (1983).

The highest-charting version of the song to date was recorded in 1988 by singer and actress Bette Midler for the soundtrack to the film Beaches. This version was released as a single in early 1989, spent one week at No. 1 on the Billboard Hot 100 singles chart in June 1989, and won Grammy Awards for both Record of the Year and Song of the Year in February 1990. On October 24, 1991, Midler's single was also certified Platinum by the Recording Industry Association of America for shipment of one million copies in the United States. In 2004, Midler's version finished at No. 44 in AFI's 100 Years...100 Songs survey of top tunes in American cinema. Perry Como recorded the song for his final studio album Today, released by RCA Records in 1987. Como wanted "Wind Beneath My Wings" released as a single, but RCA refused; Como was reportedly so angry he vowed to never record for RCA Records ever again.

In a 2002 UK poll, "Wind Beneath My Wings" was found to be the most-played song at British funerals.

Background
Several years earlier, Henley had written a poem with the same title for his ex-wife.  One day, when the two men sat down to write a song for Bob Seger, Silbar saw that Henley had written that title on his legal pad, and was inspired by those words to write the song.  Apart from the title, the song did not incorporate any of the text of the original poem.  Henley wrote the lyrics and Silbar wrote the music.

Silbar and Henley recorded a demo of the song, which they gave to musician Bob Montgomery. Montgomery then recorded his own demo version of the song, changing it from the mid-tempo version he was given to a ballad. Silbar and Henley then offered the song to many artists, which eventually resulted in Roger Whittaker becoming the first to release the song commercially. It appears on his 1982 studio album, also titled The Wind Beneath My Wings.

The song was shortly thereafter recorded by Australian artist Colleen Hewett and released by Avenue Records in 1982.  Hewitt's recording became the first version of the song to be issued as a single and to appear on a national chart, peaking at No. 52 on Australia's Kent Music Report chart.

The first year "Wind Beneath My Wings" appeared on music industry trade publication charts in the United States was 1983. Singer Lou Rawls was the first to score a major hit with the song, as his version peaked at No. 10 on the Billboard Adult Contemporary chart, No. 60 on the Billboard Hot Black Singles chart, and No. 65 on the main Billboard Hot 100 singles chart.

Gladys Knight & the Pips also released a recording of the song in 1983 under the title "Hero". Their version peaked at No. 64 on Billboards Hot Black Singles chart while also reaching No. 23 on Billboards Adult Contemporary chart.

Singer Gary Morris released a country version of the song in 1983. Morris's version of the song peaked at No. 4 on Billboards Hot Country Singles chart and later won both the Academy of Country Music and the Country Music Association awards for Song of the Year.

Colleen Hewitt version

Colleen Hewett recorded her version of the song in 1982. The arrangement for her version was written by David Hirschfelder. Hewett's keyboard player had a car accident on the way to the studio. Hirschfelder was outside one of the studios with a keyboard. He came in and wrote what Hewett described as a most incredible arrangement. The song would become a hit for her. The song backed with "Constantly" was released in February, 1983 on Avenue BA 223025. Making its way into the Australian charts, it first charted in Melbourne. It would eventually get to #19 in that city. It also got to  #16 in Adelaide and #38 in Perth. Just missing out by a couple of notches to make the Top 50 nationally, it got to #52.

Charts

Lou Rawls version

Lou Rawls was the first to land the song on a music chart in the US. The up-tempo version by Rawls was released in March 1983 on Epic 34-03758. It was backed with "Midnight Sunshine".  It appeared on his album, When the Night Comes.<ref>AllMusic - [https://www.allmusic.com/album/when-the-night-comes-mw0000869337 Lou Rawls, '"When the Night Comes AllMusic Review by Andrew Hamilton]</ref> It spent six weeks on the Billboard Hot 100 chart and on April 16, 1983, it peaked at no. 65. It also got to no. 60 on the R&B chart. Rawls once performed a twelve-minute live version of the song at a concert in Elgin, Illinois.

Charts

Gary Morris version

"Wind Beneath My Wings" was recorded by American country music artist Gary Morris and reached the Top 10 of the Billboard Hot Country Singles chart. It was named Song of the Year by both the Academy of Country Music and the Country Music Association.

Charts

Bette Midler version

"Wind Beneath My Wings" was performed by Bette Midler for the soundtrack of the 1988 film Beaches, starring Midler and Barbara Hershey. Marc Shaiman, Midler's longtime music arranger, was already a fan of the song and suggested it to her when they were identifying songs she could perform during the film. The song was named Record of the Year and Song of the Year at the Grammy Awards of 1990. The song became a worldwide hit; it charted at No. 5 in the UK, No. 2 in Iceland, No. 4 in New Zealand, and No. 1 in the United States and Australia. Midler performed the song with the fictional character Krusty the Clown on season 4 episode 22 of The Simpsons in 1993. In the days following the September 11 attacks in 2001, she performed the song live at the Prayer for America memorial service held at Yankee Stadium. In 2014, Midler performed the song following the annual in memoriam montage at the 86th Academy Awards.

Critical reception
AllMusic editor Heather Phares said that Midler turned this "inspirational love song" into "an epic pop song", noting her "demonstrative interpretation". Dennis Hunt from Los Angeles Times felt it was "unabashedly sentimental". In his review of the Beaches soundtrack, Stephen Holden from The New York Times remarked that "one is reminded of just how powerful a pop singer Ms. Midler can be when handed the right song and an arrangement that doesn't constrict her brash, larger-than-life personality." He added that "the most effective numbers are dramatic ballads" like "Wind Beneath My Wings". A reviewer from People Magazine wrote that the song "articulates the movie's theme of enduring friendship, and Midler's heartfelt delivery conveys the message a lot more succinctly and satisfyingly than the film." British The Stage noted that the song, "a cabaret favourite for several years now", has been "given a new lease of life because it has been recorded by Bette Midler." John Louie from The Stanford Daily called it a "sweet, melodious ballad".

Music video
The accompanying music video for "Wind Beneath My Wings" was made in black-and-white. It opens with a light-haired girl meeting a lonely dark-haired girl under the dock on a beach. They befriend each other and walk along the beach together. Occasionally throughout the video, Midler performs on a stage, dressed in a black dress and long curly hair. Her arms are crossed. The girls dance on the beach until the dark-haired finds a long stick, which she writes in the sand with. The light-haired girl continues to dance alone. Toward the end, the dark-haired girl drops to the sand and starts digging in it. She finds a doll buried in the sand and pushes it to her chest. As the video ends, the light-haired girl goes beyond the horizon. The video had generated more than 18 million views on YouTube as of January 2023.

Track listings
 7-inch, US (Atlantic 7-88972)
 Cassette, US (Atlantic 4-88972)
 Mini-CD, Japan (Atlantic 09P3-6159)
 "Wind Beneath My Wings" – 4:54
 "Oh Industry" – 4:05

 7-inch, UK (Atlantic A8972)
 "Wind Beneath My Wings" (edit)
 "Oh Industry"

 12-inch, UK (Atlantic A8972T)
 Mini-CD, Germany (Atlantic A8972CD)
 "Wind Beneath My Wings"
 "Oh Industry"
 "I Think It's Going to Rain Today"

 1996 CD, Germany (Atlantic 7567 85481 2)
 "Wind Beneath My Wings"
 "From a Distance"
 "In My Life"
 "To Deserve You"

Charts

Weekly charts

Year-end charts

Certifications

Release history

Other versions
In the 1990s, two English actor/singers released their versions as singles. Bill Tarmey's version in 1993, from his debut album A Gift of Love, reached No. 40 on the UK Singles Chart, while Steven Houghton's version from his self-titled debut album, reached No. 3 in 1997 and No. 21 in Ireland.

Idina Menzel sang "Wind Beneath My Wings" as a duet with Kristen Bell at her successful audition for the 2013 film Frozen. She sang it again for the 2017 film Beaches, a remake of the same film in which Bette Midler's version of the song debuted.

In the 11th episode of the ninth season of Impractical Jokers'', "Breaking Wind Beneath My Wings", former Joker Joe Gatto is forced to sing the song poorly in front of a Zoom conference as a punishment.

References

External links
 M M channel - KAMAHL Wind beneath my wings
 Roger Emnett channel - You Are The Wind Beneath My Wings Lou Rawls

1982 songs
1982 singles
1983 singles
1988 singles
1989 singles
1980s ballads
Atlantic Records singles
Pop ballads
Gary Morris songs
Colleen Hewett songs
Bette Midler songs
Sheena Easton songs
Gladys Knight & the Pips songs
Lou Rawls songs
Patti LaBelle songs
Bill Tarmey songs
Steven Houghton songs
Song recordings produced by Ron Haffkine
Song recordings produced by Arif Mardin
Billboard Hot 100 number-one singles
Cashbox number-one singles
Number-one singles in Australia
Grammy Award for Record of the Year
Grammy Award for Song of the Year
Songs written by Larry Henley
Song recordings produced by Jimmy Bowen
Warner Records singles
Songs written by Jeff Silbar
Epic Records singles
Black-and-white music videos